Sir Edward O'Brien, 4th Baronet (17 April 1773 – 13 March 1837) was an Irish parliamentarian who sat in the House of Commons of the United Kingdom from 1802 to 1826.

He was the son of Sir Lucius O'Brien, 3rd Baronet (1731–1795) and Anne French. On his father's death (possibly as the result of a duel), he inherited Sir Lucius' baronetcy and his seat in the Parliament of Ireland, representing Ennis from 1795 until the Union with Great Britain in 1801.

At the 1802 general election, O'Brien was elected as one of the two Members of Parliament (MPs) for Clare.
He was re-elected 5 times, holding the seat until the 1826 general election, which he did not contest.

He died on 13 March 1837 at age 63. He had married Charlotte Smith, daughter of William Smith, on 12 November 1799.  Among their children were:
 Lucius O'Brien, 13th Baron Inchiquin, who also succeeded his father, becoming 5th Baronet,
 William O'Brien
 Harriet Monsell.

References

External links 
 

1773 births
1837 deaths
Baronets in the Baronetage of Ireland
Edward
People from County Clare
19th-century Irish people
Irish MPs 1790–1797
Irish MPs 1798–1800
Members of the Parliament of the United Kingdom for County Clare constituencies (1801–1922)
UK MPs 1802–1806
UK MPs 1806–1807
UK MPs 1807–1812
UK MPs 1812–1818
Members of the Parliament of Ireland (pre-1801) for County Clare constituencies